Barbara Birungi (born 7 August 1986) is a female technologist and the founding manager of HiveColab in Kampala, Uganda. She is the founder of Women in Technology Uganda, an initiative aimed at helping women and girls pursue technology careers. Prior to Hive, Birungi was a staff member at the African technology firm Appfrica.

Education
Barbara graduated with honors in a bachelor's degree in Business Computing from Makerere University and received a postgraduate degree in Project Planning and Management. As  a student at Makerere she volunteered at an orphanage,  teaching basic ICT skills and career guidance to high school students, many of whom are now tech professionals. She is an enthusiast of ICT4D, innovation, and women and girls in Uganda, and has mentored and taught more than 300 young girls.

Achievements
She won the Anita Borg Change Agent award in 2014 an award that recognizes outstanding international women (non-US residents with an emphasis on developing countries) who have created opportunities for girls and women in technology. She has spoken at several international events including at UNESCO, the United Nations, Motorola, the United Nations Development Programme, and ITU on the importance of closing the gender technology gap in sub-Saharan Africa over a period of 5 years. On 26 February 2013, she was one of several speakers invited by UNESCO to describe how e-science was being used in their country to strengthen the interface between science, policy, and society.

Women In Technology
In 2015, Women In Technology Uganda was awarded the project inspire grand prize, which is awarded to outstanding organizations supporting that enable and empower women economically.

References

1986 births
Living people
21st-century Ugandan businesswomen
21st-century Ugandan businesspeople
21st-century Ugandan women scientists
21st-century Ugandan scientists
Chief executives in the technology industry